Finlay Bay Water Aerodrome  was located on Finlay Bay, British Columbia, Canada.

References

Defunct seaplane bases in British Columbia